Minuscule 799 (in the Gregory-Aland numbering), ε196 (von Soden), is a Greek minuscule manuscript of the New Testament written on parchment. Palaeographically it has been assigned to the 11th century. The manuscript has complex contents.

Description 
The codex contains the text of the four Gospels, on 366 parchment leaves (size ).
The text is written in one column per page, 18-20 lines per page.

There is also another division according to the smaller Ammonian Sections (in Mark 234 sections, the last section in 16:9), with references to the Eusebian Canons.

It contains subscriptions added by a later hand.

Text 
The Greek text of the codex is a representative of the Byzantine text-type. Hermann von Soden classified it to the textual family Kx. Aland placed it in Category V.

According to the Claremont Profile Method it has mixed text in Luke 1, mixed Byzantine text in Luke 10, and represent the textual family Kx in Luke 20. It belongs to the textual subgroup 35.

It lacks Pericope Adulterae (John 7:53-8:11).

History 
According to C. R. Gregory the manuscript was written in the 12th century. The manuscript is currently dated by the INTF to the 11th century. The manuscript was bought in 1878 by Gregorius Papadopoulos from Agrypolei.

It was added to the list of New Testament manuscripts by Gregory (799). Gregory saw the manuscript in 1886.

The manuscript is now housed at the National Library of Greece (117) in Athens.

See also 

 List of New Testament minuscules
 Biblical manuscript
 Textual criticism
 Minuscule 798

References

Further reading 

 

Greek New Testament minuscules
11th-century biblical manuscripts
Manuscripts of the National Library of Greece